Holy Cow is a 2022 Indian Hindi-language satirical comedy film written and directed by Sai Kabir.  Starring Sanjay Mishra,Tigmanshu Dhulia, Sadiya Siddiqui and Nawazuddin Siddiqui in a cameo appearance. It released on 26 August 2022.

Cast
Sanjay Mishra as Salim Ansari
Tigmanshu Dhulia as Shamshuddin
Mukesh S. Bhatt
Sadiya Siddiqui as Safiya
Nawazuddin Siddiqui
Rahul Mittra
Hemendra Dandotiya
Himanshu Pandey

Music
The music of the film is composed by Sukhwinder Singh and Rev Shergill.

References

External links
 

2022 films
2022 comedy films
Indian satirical films
2020s Hindi-language films